Christopher Wandesford, 1st Viscount Castlecomer (19 August 1656 – 15 September 1707) was an Anglo-Irish politician and peer.

Wandesford was the son and heir of Sir Christopher Wandesford, 1st Baronet of Kirklington, Yorkshire, by his wife Eleanor Lowther, daughter of Sir John Lowther, 1st Baronet. He was educated at the University of Cambridge. His grandfather, the first Christopher Wandesford, had been briefly Lord Deputy of Ireland in 1640 and acquired substantial lands in County Kilkenny.

Wandesford held the office of Member of Parliament for Ripon between 1679 and 1681. He succeeded to his father's baronetcy in February 1687. He was High Sheriff of Yorkshire in 1689 and 1690. As an opponent of James II, on 7 May 1689 he was attainted in the Parliament of Ireland and had his estates seized. However, following the defeat of the Jacobite army in Ireland, he was richly rewarded by William III. He subsequently served as the MP for St Canice in Ireland between 1692 and 1706, when he was raised to the peerage. He became a member of the Privy Council of Ireland on 10 May 1695. He was elevated to the peerage when he was created Viscount Castlecomer and Baron Wandesford in the Peerage of Ireland on 15 March 1706. He died in September the following year.

He married Elizabeth Montagu, the sister of Charles Montagu, 1st Earl of Halifax, and together they had five children. He was succeeded by his eldest son, also Christopher.

References

1656 births
1707 deaths
Viscounts in the Peerage of Ireland
Peers of Ireland created by Queen Anne
17th-century Anglo-Irish people
18th-century Anglo-Irish people
High Sheriffs of Yorkshire
Members of the Privy Council of Ireland
English MPs 1679
English MPs 1680–1681
Wandesford, Christopher
Wandesford, Christopher
Wandesford, Christopher
Members of the Parliament of Ireland (pre-1801) for County Kilkenny constituencies